"Forever Young" is a song by German synth-pop band Alphaville from their 1984 debut studio album of the same name. The single was successful in Scandinavia and in the European German-speaking countries in the same year.

The single achieved more success in the United States than in the United Kingdom, but it failed to reach the American top 40 despite three separate US single releases. Though not the group's highest-charting single in Europe, "Forever Young" was one of the band's signature songs and has been covered by numerous artists. It also formed the basis of Jay-Z's song "Young Forever". "Forever Young" is written in the key of C major.

Alphaville versions

Original 1984 version

Background and video
Originally released by Alphaville as a single in 1984, "Forever Young" was available in both its original mix and in a dance version, entitled the "Special Dance Mix". Over the years, the band has released several remixes and demo versions of the song.

The single initially reached number 93 in 1985 on the US Billboard Hot 100 and the top 40 on the U.S. Hot Dance Music/ Club Play Singles. When re-released in 1988, it peaked at number 65 on the Billboard Hot 100.  

The song's music video, directed by Brian Ward, shows the band performing in one of the halls at Holloway Sanatorium in Virginia Water, England. A number of people from children to the elderly, dressed in ragged finery, awake to watch the band, then walk through a diamond-shaped glowing portal.

Track listings
7-inch single
 "Forever Young" – 3:45
 "Welcome to the Sun" – 3:09

12-inch maxi single
 "Forever Young" (special dance version) – 6:06
 "Forever Young" – 3:45
 "Welcome to the Sun" – 3:09

 "Welcome to the Sun" also appeared (in a remix and a re-recording) on 1999's Dreamscapes.

Other releases
The original album version has also appeared on the following official Alphaville releases:
 Alphaville Amiga Compilation, 1988
 Alphaville: The Singles Collection, 1988
 First Harvest 1984–92, 1992

The "Special Dance Version" and the B-side "Welcome to the Sun" were both included on so80s presents Alphaville (2014).

Other versions
This song has been released several times in various forms, including remixes and demos, on:
 Alphaville: The Singles Collection, 1988 (remixed)
 History, 1993 (covered live)
 Dreamscapes, 1999 (demo, demo remix, performed live and re-recorded acoustically)
 Little America, 1999 (performed live)
 Stark Naked and Absolutely Live, 2000 (performed live)
 Forever Pop, 2001 (remixed)
 "Forever Young 2001" (see below)
 "Forever Young The Remix", 2006 (see below)

Charts

Certifications

Forever Young 2001
In 2001, Alphaville released a new set of remixes in a "limited fan edition" called "Forever Young 2001". This single contained three music tracks, one spoken word track, and a PC-only track.

This CD was released to fans for free, only postage needed to be paid. The names of every fan who had requested a copy were printed on the inside cover. Copies were hand-signed by the band. The remixes that appear on the single have not appeared on other releases.

The cover is a still image from the video, which was created by The Cartoon Saloon.

Track listings
CD single
 "Forever Young" (F.A.F's Diamonds in the Sun Mix) – 3:56
 Remixed by: F.A.F
 "Forever Young" (Factory Mix) – 4:21
 Remixed by: José Alvarez-Brill
 "Forever Young" (Original Demo 1983) – 4:43
 "Thank You" (Spoken Version) – 3:44
 "Forever Young" (Magix PlayR) (PC only)

 The "Thank You" track consisted of then-member Bernard Lloyd thanking the fans, while speaking over one of his "favorite tracks," which was a remix of "Lassie Come Home," as it was to appear on the 2001 remix album Forever Pop.
 The Magix PlayR track was a PC-only application that allowed fans to customize the FAF remix to their liking.

CD promo single
 "Forever Young (F.A.F's Diamonds in the Sun Mix)" — 3:56

 This promotional CD was produced in a strictly limited run of 500 copies and not sold commercially.

Forever Young the Remix
Released in 2006, this CD contains two new remixes by notable remix artist Bill Hamel. It also includes a digitally remastered version of the original album version of the song. The remix reached number 31 on the Australian ARIA Singles Chart, peaking higher than the original version in 1986, which only charted at number 47.

Track listing
CD single
 "Forever Young" (Hamel album mix) – 4:58
 "Forever Young" (Bill Hamel club mix) – 7:39
 "Forever Young" (remastered original version) – 3:47

Interactive version

In 1994, German electronic group Interactive released a cover of "Forever Young" which reached number seven in Germany and number ten in both Denmark and the Netherlands. It also made the top 20 in five other countries and on the Eurochart Hot 100, the song reached number 34. This electronic dance version does not contain most of the song's lyrics and only includes a slightly modified chorus as the sole vocals. In 2002, German DJ and music producer Kosmonova remixed their version of "Forever Young". The remix peaked at number 21 in Germany and number 37 in the UK.

Music video
The music video for "Forever Young" was directed by Basil Schlegel. It features kids attending and partying in a night club.

Track listing
 CD maxi (Germany)
"Forever Young" (Radio Edit) - 3:40 
"Forever Young" (Extended Version) - 5:59 
"Mobilé" - 5:04 
"Waves of Balah" - 5:44

Charts

Certifications

Youth Group version

In 2005, Australian rock band Youth Group were asked by the producers of the American television series The O.C. to record a version of "Forever Young" for use in the show, following a positive response to the use of their single "Shadowland" in a previous episode. Their version of "Forever Young" was used in the show and the show's trailers and was included on the soundtrack album Music from the OC: Mix 5. Released as a single in Australia on 6 March 2006, the song reached number one on the ARIA Singles Chart for two weeks. The track was included on Youth Group's third studio album, Casino Twilight Dogs, released later that year.

Track listing
Australian CD single
 "Forever Young" – 4:33
 "Someone Else's Dream" – 2:36
 "Forever Young" (edit) – 3:26

Charts

Certifications

Becky Hill version

In 2020, British singer Becky Hill released a cover version of the song. It was released on 13 November 2020 by Polydor Records and Eko Records. The song was selected as the soundtrack to the 2020 McDonald's Christmas advert in the UK.

Background
The song raised money for FareShare, in which McDonald's donated five million meals for charity. Hill also donated 10p from every download, going to food charity FareShare. She said on her Twitter account, "'forever young' is bigger than just a nice christmas advert & song. @mcdonaldsuk has committed to funding @fareshareuk to redistribute over 5 million meals by April 2021 to families in need. at least 10p of every download goes towards a great cause. no child should be hungry".

Personnel
Credits adapted from Tidal.
 Charlie Hugall – producer, mixer, recording engineer, studio personnel
 Bernhard Lloyd – composer
 Frank Mertens – composer
 Marian Gold – composer, lyricist
 Adam Rust – associated performer, keyboards
 Becky Hill – associated performer, vocals
 Matt Colton – mastering engineer, studio personnel

Charts

Certifications

Cash Cash version

In 2010, American electronic music group Cash Cash released a cover of the song. It was released on 8 March 2010 through Universal Records. The song was serviced to radio in the United States on 12 May 2010.

Personnel
Credits adapted from AllMusic.
 Cash Cash – primary artist
 Bernhard Lloyd – composer
 Frank Mertens – composer
 Marian Gold – composer, lyricist

Music video
A music video for the song was released via YouTube on 29 June 2010. As of 2014, the video has since been removed.

Charts

Other versions and samples
In 1985, Laura Branigan covered the song on her album Hold Me. This version was also included on her 2010 digitally remastered two-disc greatest hits compilation Shine On: The Ultimate Collection.
In 1989, reggae artist Wayne Wonder released a cover version that achieved some popularity in Jamaica. A recording of Wonder's version was released on the Alphaville Fan Club release History (1993).
In 1993, German heavy metal guitarist Axel Rudi Pell covered "Forever Young" on his album The Ballads, and it was also released as a single.
In 1997, Swedish vocal group Ainbusk covered the song in Swedish, as För evigt nu, with lyrics by Marie Nilsson-Lind. They also recorded the song for their 2001 holiday album I midvintertid, en jul på Gotland.
Karel Gott covered the song in Czech, as Být stále mlád in 1999, and in German as Für immer jung, released on his 2000 album with the same name, released on 7 February 2000.
In 2009, American rapper Jay-Z sampled a reworked 1992 version of the Wayne Wonder cover (which now featured Buju Banton & Stone Love) for his album The Blueprint 3. Retitled "Young Forever", Jay-Z's rap version featured Mr Hudson and reached number 10 on the UK Singles Chart.
American singer Brandi Carlile included a live performance of "Forever Young" as a hidden final track on her Live at Benaroya Hall with the Seattle Symphony album (2011).
In 2011, EP by Sam Concepcion  in commemoration of his 10th anniversary in the show business industry. It was released in September 2011 under Universal Records. composer: Ito Rapadas of Neo Colors & Kathleen Dy Go.
In 2019, Undressd released a cover that charted in Sweden peaking at number 44 on Sverigetopplistan, the official Swedish singles chart.
In 2019, Frederick Lloyd, under his "Ursine Vulpine" alias, recorded a cover of the song. His cover was featured in the trailers to the 2019 film Gemini Man as well as the 2021 video game New World. 
At the end of 2019, a version of the song, sung by American singer-songwriter Andrea von Kampen, was recorded for the Hafod Hardware Christmas advertisement.

References

External links
 Alphaville
 
 
 
 Bushido featuring Karel Gott
 

1984 songs
1984 singles
1994 singles
2001 singles
2006 singles
2020 singles
ARIA Award-winning songs
Alphaville (band) songs
Becky Hill songs
Blow Up singles
Number-one singles in Australia
Number-one singles in Sweden
Songs about nuclear war and weapons
Songs written by Marian Gold
Songs written by Bernhard Lloyd
Songs written by Frank Mertens
Warner Music Group singles
Ivy League Records singles
Polydor Records singles
Songs containing the I–V-vi-IV progression
1980s ballads
New wave ballads
Synth-pop ballads